Koldo Zuazo (Eibar, Gipuzkoa, 1956) is a Basque linguist, professor at the University of the Basque Country and specialist in Basque language dialectology and sociolinguistics.

The dialects of the Basque language 
Since 1998, Zuazo's work on the Basque dialects has drawn a new classification and a new map of these dialects—this has been a revolution in a field where few changes were made since Louis Lucien Bonaparte's works (1863).

According to Zuazo, the Basque dialects (together with other language innovations) originated in urban areas:
 Iruña
 Gasteiz
 Central Biscay (Durango-Zornotza-Gernika-Bermeo)
 Beterri in Gipuzkoa (Donostia-Hernani-Andoain-Tolosa)
 Coastal Lapurdi
 The source of the Eastern dialect isn't clear, Zuazo states that it may have happened in Bearn or in Huesca
Zuazo has observed that all dialects had a similar influence of Latin and therefore he thinks that all dialects originated after Roman times. This is aligned with Mitxelena's earlier thoughts on this subject.

Zuazo thinks that the Western dialect originated in Araba, based on the similarities between the dialects of Biscay, west of Navarre, the Deba valley and Goierri.

Bibliography

Non-fiction
 Euskararen batasuna (The standardization of Basque language). Euskaltzaindia, 1988.
 Euskararen sendabelarrak (Tips and solutions for some of the problems of Basque language). Alberdania, 2000.
 Euskara batua: ezina ekinez egina (The challenge of the standardization of Basque language). Elkar, 2005.
 Deba ibarreko euskara. Dialektologia eta tokiko batua (Basque language in the Deba Valley. Dialects and local standards). Badihardugu, 2006.
 Euskalkiak. Euskararen dialektoak (Description of the dialects of Basque language). Elkar, 2008.
 Sakanako euskara. Burundako hizkera (Basque language in the region of Burunda). Nafarroako Gobernua eta Euskaltzaindia, 2010.
 El euskera y sus dialectos (Basque language and its dialects). Alberdania, 2010.
 Arabako euskara (Basque language in Araba). Elkar, 2012.
 Mailopeko euskara (Basque language in Mailope). UPV/EHU, 2013.
 Euskalkiak (The Basque dialects). Elkar, 2014.
 Uribe Kosta, Txorierri eta Mungialdeko euskara (Basque language in Uribe Kosta, Txorierri and Mungialde). UPV/EHU, 2016 (in collaboration with Urtzi Goitia)

Fiction 
 Neure buruaren alde (novel). Alberdania, 2011.

Other publications 
 Euskalkiak (website): contains information about the standard Basque language and local standardsand dialects, combining text and media resources. Published in 2015 with the support of the University of the Basque Country.  combining text and media resources. Published in 2015 with the support of the University of the Basque Country.,  .  .

References

External links 
 Koldo Zuazo (2008), map of Basque dialects.
 Koldo Zuazo (2007), «Euskalkien jatorriaz eta bilakaeraz», Berria, 2007-12-09.
 Koldo Zuazo (1997), «Euskara Araban», Uztaro, 21. zenbakia.

Basque-language scholars
1956 births
Dialectologists
Sociolinguists
Living people
People from Eibar
Academic staff of the University of the Basque Country
Indigenous_linguists